Bangladesh Medical Association is the national professional association of medical doctors in Bangladesh. Dr. Mustafa Jalal Mohiuddin is the President of the Bangladesh Medical Association while Dr. Md. Ehteshamul Huq Choudhury is the General Secretary.

History
The association traces its origins to the Pakistan Medical Association which was established in 1948. Following the Independence of Bangladesh, doctors in Bangladesh reorganized remnants of the Pakistan Medical Association and adopted a constitution of Bangladesh Medical Association on 14 January 1973.

Structure 
BMA is run by Central Council and Central executive committee. Officers are elected by the members of BMA for two years.

International affiliation 
The association is a member of the Commonwealth Medical Association and the World Medical Association. It is affiliated with the British Medical Association.

Branches 
BMA has 67 regional branches all over the country. Each branch has elected president and general secretary of their own.

Publication
 Bangladesh Medical Journal. ISSN 2219-1607 (ISSN-L 0301-035X)

References

1976 establishments in Bangladesh
Organisations based in Dhaka
Professional associations based in Bangladesh
Trade associations based in Bangladesh